CCIR System E is an analog broadcast television system used in France and Monaco, associated with monochrome 819-line high resolution broadcasts. Transmissions started in 1949 and ended in 1985.

System E specifications 
Some of the important specs are listed below.

System E implementation provided very good (near HDTV) picture quality but with an uneconomical use of bandwidth. With the usual additions of sound carrier and vestigial sideband the result was a combined signal that demanded approximately two to three times the bandwidth of more moderately specified standards, even when colour was added to them (as the color subcarrier resides within the Luma signal space).
For this reason, France gradually abandoned it in favor of the 625-lines standard, implementing System L with SECAM color.

The final 819-line transmissions in Metropolitan France took place in Paris, from the Eiffel Tower, on 19 July 1983. TMC in Monaco were the last broadcasters to transmit 819-line television, closing down their System E transmitter in 1985.

Television channels were arranged as follows:

System F 
CCIR System F was an adaptation of System E used in Belgium (1953, RTB) and Luxembourg (1955, Télé Luxembourg). With only half the vision bandwidth and approximately half the sound carrier offset, it allowed French 819-line programming to squeeze into the 7 MHz VHF broadcast channels used in those neighboring countries, albeit with a substantial loss of horizontal resolution. Use of System F was discontinued in Belgium in February 1968, and in Luxembourg in September 1971.

See also 

Broadcast television systems
Television transmitter
Transposer

Notes and references

External links 
 World Analogue Television Standards and Waveforms
 Fernsehnormen aller Staaten und Gebiete der Welt

ITU-R recommendations
Television technology
E, System
F, System
Broadcast engineering
CCIR System